Lugushwa Airport  is an airstrip serving the gold-mining town of Lugushwa in Sud-Kivu Province, Democratic Republic of the Congo.

See also

Transport in the Democratic Republic of the Congo
 List of airports in the Democratic Republic of the Congo

References

External links
 Lugushwa
 OpenStreetMap - Lugushwa
 OurAirports - Lugushwa

Airports in South Kivu